James M. Shuart (May, 09 1931 – May 13, 2016) was the president of Hofstra University from 1976 to 2001.  Prior to that he served as a Nassau County, New York official.  Also, he served as Assistant President to Hofstra President Clifford Lord during the 1960s in addition to serving as an administrator in the division and then school of education.  The school's James M. Shuart Stadium is named after him, and a bust of his likeness stands at the entrance.

He grew up in College Point, Queens graduated from Flushing High School in 1949 and went to Hofstra on a football scholarship. After graduating, he married his college sweetheart, Marjorie Strunk, and was immediately drafted into the Army, where he served as a counterintelligence officer in postwar Korea. After his discharge, he worked as an insurance agent before landing a job in the Hofstra admissions office in 1959.

Shuart died at the age of 85 on May 13, 2016, from cardiovascular disease.

Education 
Shuart was a Hofstra alum, with a bachelor's degree in history (1953) and master's in social science (1962).  He later earned a doctorate in higher education from New York University in 1966.

Early career
He was Nassau County Commissioner of Public Services in the early ‘70s for three years and later served as deputy Nassau County Executive. After that, he oversaw Nassau's Commission on Priorities.

Related works

References

External links

1930s births
2016 deaths
Hofstra University alumni
Presidents of Hofstra University
Year of birth missing
Steinhardt School of Culture, Education, and Human Development alumni